Highline Trail or High Line Trail may refer to:

 Highline Trail in Canmore, Alberta, Canada

United States
 Highline National Recreation Trail, in Arizona
 Highline Canal National Recreation Trail, in Denver, Colorado
 Highline Loop National Recreation Trail, a Colorado trail in Montezuma and La Plata counties
 Frisco Highline Trail, in Springfield, Missouri
 Highline Trail (Glacier National Park), in Montana
 Uinta Highline Trail, in Utah
 Highline Trail, in Mount Adams Recreation Area, Washington
 Highline Trail, a trail in Sublette County, Wyoming
 Granite Highline Trail, a trail in Teton County, Wyoming